Charles Erlin Jackson Clarke (19 December 1795 – 28 April 1844) was an English cathedral organist, who served at Durham Cathedral and Worcester Cathedral.

Clarke was a chorister at Worcester Cathedral from 1804. In 1811, aged 15, he was appointed organist of Durham Cathedral. In 1813 he returned to Worcester, remaining cathedral organist until his death in 1844.

References

English classical organists
British male organists
Cathedral organists
1795 births
1844 deaths
19th-century English musicians
19th-century British male musicians
Musicians from Worcester, England
19th-century classical musicians
Male classical organists
19th-century organists